Ho Meng Hua (1 January 1923 - 19 May 2009) was a Chinese film director from Shanghai, working in the Cinema of Hong Kong and the Cinema of Taiwan.

Early life 
In 1923, Ho was born in Guangdong province, China. Ho grew up in Shanghai, China.

Education 
Ho graduated from Shanghai Drama Institute.

Career 
In 1955, Ho joined the Shaw Brothers studio. In 1958, Ho's directorial debut was An Appointment After Dark. Ho eventually became one the studios' most prolific directors, directing about fifty films between then and 1980.

Filmography

Films 
 1955 Romance in the Western Chamber - as screenwriter.
 1956 Miss Kikuko - as assistant director.
 1958 Red Lantern - as director.
 1958 An Appointment after Dark - as director.
 1959 Day-Time Husband - as director.
 1960 Rendezvous in the South Sea
 1960 Malayan Affair - as director, screenwriter.
 1964 Between Tears and Smiles - co-director
 1964 The Warlord and the Actress 
 1966 The Monkey Goes West
 1966 Princess Iron Fan
 1967 Susanna - as director.
 1967 The Midnight Murder 
 1967 The King With My Face
 1967 Cave of the Silken Web
 1968 Land of Many Perfumes
 1968 The Jade Raksha 
 1968 Killer Darts 
 1969 Vengeance Is A Golden Blade
 1970 Lady of Steel 
 1971 The Lady Hermit 
 1971 The Long Chase
 1972 The Black Enforcer
 1972 The Human Goddess
 1973 The Kiss of Death
 1973 Ambush
 1973 The Master of Kung Fu
 1974 The Sinful Adultress
 1974 Young Passion 
 1975 All Mixed Up
 1975 The Golden Lion
 1975 The Flying Guillotine 
 1975 Black Magic
 1976 Black Magic 2  U.S. title: "Revenge Of The Zombies"
 1976 Oily Maniac - as director.
 1976 The Criminals
 1976 The Dragon Missile
 1977 The Mighty Peking Man a.k.a. U.S. title: "Goliathon"
 1978 The Vengeful Beauty
 1978 The Psychopath
 1978 Shaolin Handlock
 1979 Abbot of Shaolin a.k.a. U.S. title: "A Slice Of Death"
 1980 The Swift Sword

Personal life 
In 1948, Ho moved to Hong Kong.

On May 19, 2009, Ho died in Hong Kong.

References

External links

 What We Talk About When We Talk About Ho Meng-Hua (January 2004)

1923 births
2009 deaths
Film directors from Shanghai
Hong Kong film directors
Chinese expatriates in Taiwan
Chinese emigrants to British Hong Kong